John Dering Nettleton, VC (28 June 1917 – 13 July 1943) was a South African officer in the Royal Air Force (RAF) during the Second World War. He is most famous for leading the Augsburg raid, a daylight attack against the MAN U-boat engine plant in Augsburg on 17 April 1942. For his role in this mission he was awarded the Victoria Cross, the highest award for gallantry in the face of the enemy that can be awarded to British and Commonwealth forces.

Early life
Born on 28 June 1917 in Nongoma, Natal Province, South Africa, Nettleton was the grandson of Admiral A.T.D. Nettleton. He was educated at Western Province Preparatory School in Cape Town from 1928 to 1930. Nettleton served as a naval cadet on the General Botha training ship, and then for 18 months in the South African Merchant Marine. He took up civil engineering, working in various parts of South Africa.

Second World War
Commissioned in the Royal Air Force (RAF) in December 1938, Nettleton then served with Nos. 207, 98 and 185 Squadrons before joining No. 44 Squadron flying the Handley Page Hampden. He took part in a daylight attack on Brest on 24 July 1941 and in a series of other bombing raids and was mentioned in despatches in September 1940. Nettleton was promoted flying officer in July 1940, flight lieutenant in February 1941 and was a squadron leader by July 1941. No. 44 Squadron was based at RAF Waddington, Lincolnshire at this time and had taken delivery of Lancasters in late 1941.

In 1942 a daylight bombing mission was planned by RAF Bomber Command against the MAN U-boat engine plant in Augsburg in Bavaria, responsible for the production of half of Germany's U‑boat engines. It was the first major mission flown using the new Avro Lancaster, a four engine bomber with tremendous lift, great range, and a heavy defensive armament. It would be the longest low‑level penetration raid made during the course of the Second World War. Nettleton was nearing the end of his first tour, and was placed in command of the mission. The operation would require the force to fly at very low level to avoid detection from German radar. To prepare for the raid the two squadrons committed were pulled out of the bombing campaign against Germany to practice low level formation flying.

The Augsburg raid commenced on the afternoon of 17 April 1942, when Nettleton led six Lancaster bombers from RAF Waddington south in two flights of three. A few miles away at RAF Woodhall Spa, six more Lancasters from No. 97 Squadron took to the air and headed south as well. The two groups did not link up, which was not required as part of their mission. Both groups reached Selsey Bill independently, flew out over the channel and turned toward the French coast. The No. 97 Squadron group caught sight of the No. 44 Squadron aircraft as they approached the continent, but the No. 44 Squadron aircraft were running a course slightly to the north of what was planned and the No. 97 Squadron commander chose not to close up. Shortly after Nettleton's group crossed the French coast near Dieppe, German fighters of Stab and II./JG 2, returning after intercepting a planned diversionary raid which had been organised to assist the bombers, attacked the No. 44 Squadron aircraft a short way inland. Four of the Lancasters were shot down. Nettleton continued towards the target, and his two remaining aircraft attacked the factory, bombing it amid heavy anti aircraft fire. Both aircraft dropped their bombs but were hit as they flew away from the target. Nettleton's aircraft limped back on three engines. His companion's Lancaster caught on fire and crashed. At the end of his return flight Nettleton's aircraft overflew the United Kingdom and was out over the Irish Sea before turning back and finally landing near Blackpool. He was awarded the Victoria Cross, gazetted on 24 April 1942. His award citation read:

On the night of 12/13 July 1943, Bomber Command put in a raid of 295 Lancasters against Turin in northern Italy. The object of the raid was to encourage the fascist government of Italy to withdraw from the war. Turin was a distant target, and being summer the nights were relatively short. With limited darkness, the return to England could not be flown direct, and had to be routed over the Bay of Biscay to avoid German day fighters. Flying Lancaster KM-Z (ED331), Nettleton took off from Dunholme Lodge at 10:23 pm. Another Lancaster on the mission was that of Leonard Bradfield. As dawn rose a number of Lancasters caught sight of each other and grouped together for protection. Also returning from the mission, Bradfield and his crew spotted a group of Lancasters off their starboard side, on a track some 30 degrees to their west. Bradfield was confident he was on the correct course. He had a good visual, and his position had been confirmed with a strong signal from Gee. The Lancasters to their west were too near the coast. Bradfield's aircraft signalled, but they received no response.

At about 6:30 am the group of Lancasters with Nettleton were intercepted by German day fighters that had been scrambled from their base south of Brest. Among the Lancaster losses from the mission, three aircraft were known to have been shot down over the Bay of Biscay, while six more were lost without a trace. Nettleton and his crew were among the losses. Their bodies were never recovered. All are commemorated on the Runnymede Memorial.

Legacy
Following the war the government of Southern Rhodesia named a new school after Squadron Leader Nettleton: Nettleton Junior School, Braeside, Salisbury, Southern Rhodesia (present-day Harare, Zimbabwe).

On 2 March 1994, a Junior Rank accommodation block was formally opened at RAF Shawbury under the name of Nettleton. A commemorative plaque is located inside detailing Nettleton's life and service.

References
Citations

Bibliography

External links

Portrait and short biography of Squadron Leader John Dering Nettleton, VC, alliedairforcesmonument.org; accessed 7 December 2014.
The Augsberg Raid – Official RAF history, raf.mod.uk; accessed 7 December 2014.

1917 births
1943 deaths
Royal Air Force squadron leaders
South African World War II recipients of the Victoria Cross
Royal Air Force recipients of the Victoria Cross
Aviators killed by being shot down
Royal Air Force personnel killed in World War II
White South African people
People from Natal
South African emigrants to the United Kingdom